Mario Alberto Escobar Toca (born on 19 September 1986) is a Guatemalan football referee who is a listed international referee for FIFA since 2013. He is also one of the referees for the Liga Nacional de Fútbol de Guatemala.

On 15 May 2019, Escobar was officially selected as a referee for the 2019 CONCACAF Gold Cup in Costa Rica, Jamaica, and the United States. He was summoned to officiate the 2019 CONCACAF Gold Cup Final between Mexico and the United States, and additionally refereed the 2020 CONCACAF Champions League Final between UANL and Los Angeles FC.

Escobar was also one of the appointed referees of the 2019 FIFA U-17 World Cup in Brazil.

References

1986 births
Living people
Place of birth missing (living people)
Guatemalan football referees
CONCACAF Gold Cup referees
CONCACAF Champions League referees
2022 FIFA World Cup referees
FIFA World Cup referees